Meramec Township is an inactive township in Phelps County, in the U.S. state of Missouri.

Meramec Township was erected in 1857, taking its name from the Meramec River.

References

Townships in Missouri
Townships in Phelps County, Missouri
1857 establishments in Missouri